The Fisher Youngster is a Canadian single-seat, conventional landing gear, single-engined, biplane kit aircraft designed for construction by amateur builders. The aircraft was inspired by the German Bücker Bü 133 Jungmeister aerobatic aircraft of the 1930s.

Fisher Flying Products was originally based in Edgeley, North Dakota, USA but the company is now located in Vaughan, Ontario, Canada.

Development
The Youngster was designed by Fisher Aircraft in the United States in 1994 and was intended to comply with the US Experimental - Amateur-built category, although it qualifies as an ultralight aircraft in some countries, such as Canada. It also qualifies as a US Experimental Light Sport Aircraft.

The aircraft is stressed for +6 and -3.75 g and is suitable for sportsman category aerobatics.

The construction of the Youngster is of wood with the fuselage built in a Warren Truss covered with a  birch plywood skin. The fuselage employs longitudinal stringers to replicate the Jungmeister's shape. The wings and tail are covered with doped aircraft fabric. The wings feature interplane struts, cabane struts, bottom wing ailerons only and a NACA 2315 airfoil. Like the original Jungmeister upon which it is based, the Youngster has no flaps. The Youngster's main landing gear has bungee suspension. The cockpit can be left open or covered with an optional canopy for cold weather operations. The company claims an amateur builder can complete the aircraft from the kit in 500 hours.

The specified engines for the Youngster include the  Rotax 503 two-stroke and the Great Plains Aircraft  four-stroke Volkswagen air-cooled engine.

By late 2004 20 Youngsters were flying.

Variants
Youngster
Original Rotax-powered design
Youngster V
Great Plains Volkswagen air-cooled engine  powered version

Specifications

See also

References

External links
Official website
Photo of a Fisher Youngster on Airliners.net

1990s Canadian ultralight aircraft
Light-sport aircraft
Aircraft first flown in 1994
Biplanes
Single-engined tractor aircraft